Ellen Browning Scripps (October 18, 1836 – August 3, 1932) was an American journalist and philanthropist who was the founding donor of several major institutions in Southern California. She and her half-brother E. W. Scripps created the E. W. Scripps Company, America's largest chain of newspapers and patron of the Scripps National Spelling Bee, linking Midwestern industrial cities with booming towns in the West. By the 1920s, Ellen Browning Scripps was worth an estimated $30 million (or $388 million in 2020 dollars), most of which she gave away. 

In 1924, she founded the Scripps Research Institute (TSRI), in the La Jolla neighborhood of San Diego, CA. She appeared on the cover of Time magazine after founding Scripps College in Claremont, California.  She also donated millions of dollars to organizations worldwide that promised to advance democratic principles and women's education.

Family history
Ellen Browning Scripps was born on October 18, 1836, on South Molton St. in St. George Parish, London. Her father, James Mogg Scripps (1803–1873), was the youngest of six children born to London publisher William Armiger Scripps (1772–1851) and Mary Dixie (1771–1838). He was apprenticed to Charles Lewis, the leading bookbinder of London, where he learned the trade. James married his cousin Elizabeth Sabey in 1829 and had two children, only one of whom lived to maturity, Elizabeth Mary (1831–1914). Elizabeth Sabey Scripps died the day after the latter's birth. Two years later, James Mogg married Ellen Mary Saunders. They had six children, five of whom lived to adulthood: James E. Scripps (1835–1906), Ellen Browning (1836–1932), William Arminger (1838–1914), George Henry (1839–1900) and John Mogg (1840–1863). Ellen Mary Scripps died of breast cancer in 1841.

After the failure of his bookbinding shop and the death of his second wife, James Mogg emigrated to the United States with his six children in April 1844. They headed to Rushville, Illinois, where other members of the Scripps family owned property. James Mogg married his third wife Julia Osborn in November 1844. They had five children: Julia Anne (1847–1898), Thomas Osborn (1848–53), Frederick Tudor (1850–1936), Eliza Virginia (1852–1921), and Edward Willis (1854–1926), the well-known newspaper tycoon and founder of The E.W. Scripps Company.

Biography

Early life
Born in London and raised on the Illinois prairie, Ellen Browning Scripps was an avid reader and learner at an early age. In 1855, a year before attending college, she was granted a teaching certificate and started teaching in Schuyler County, IL. She was the only one of her ten siblings to attend college, studying science and mathematics at Knox College in Galesburg, IL, one of the few educational institutions to admit women, even if it did not yet grant college degrees. She graduated in 1859 with a certificate from the Female Collegiate Department and honors in mathematics. Afterwards, she returned to Rushville, Illinois, to teach in a one-room schoolhouse.

Newspaper journalist
After the American Civil War, Scripps gave up her job as a schoolteacher and headed to Detroit, at that time a burgeoning industrial center in the West. She joined her brother James E. Scripps in publishing The Detroit Evening News, a short, inexpensive, and politically independent newspaper pitched to the city's working class, becoming a writer and copyeditor for the family paper. This was to be the start of the Scripps family fortune. She wrote a daily column, nicknamed "Miss Ellen's Miscellany," that reduced local and national news to short sound bites. According to Gerald Baldasty, "Her columns of "Miscellany" and other topics became the inspiration for the Newspaper Enterprise Association, a news features service that Edward Scripps established in 1902." In the 1870s and 1880s, the Scripps papers expanded to include The Cleveland Press, The Cincinnati Post, and the St. Louis Chronicle.

A shareholder, Ellen B. Scripps played an important role in Scripps councils. She gave business advice to her younger half-brother E.W. and sided with him in family financial disputes. He credited her with saving him from financial ruin in more than one instance. In the 1880s, E.W.'s attempt to seize control of the Scripps Publishing Company failed, resulting in a divisive lawsuit and a break with his half-brother James.

Travels
In 1881, Ellen and E.W. travelled to Europe so that the latter could take a break from work and recover his health, and Ellen kept records of her travels in a travel diary. They took the railroad through France to the Mediterranean Sea, crossed by ship to Algeria, then headed north into Italy, Austria, and Germany. Ellen wrote weekly letters back to The Detroit Evening News about their travels, describing her impressions of people and places.
When Ellen returned to her job at the News, she found that she was no longer needed at the copy desk. She began a decade of travel, heading to the American South, New England, Cuba, and Mexico. In 1888–1889 she made a second trip to Europe that included a visit to L'Exposition Universelle in Paris and three months in Spain. A decade later, she toured France, Belgium, and England.

California
In 1887, Ellen's sister Julia Anne moved to Alameda, California, to seek a remedy for crippling rheumatoid arthritis. She found a home at the Remedial Institute and School of Philosophy, also known as the New Order of Life, in Alameda, one of the many utopian communities founded in the late nineteenth century.  Concerned about her sister's welfare, Ellen made her first trip to California in the winter of 1890. Soon afterwards, Ellen and E.W. bought land in San Diego and established Miramar Ranch with their brother Fred. Miramar Ranch encompassed what is now Scripps Ranch, a suburban community, and the Marine Corps Air Station Miramar. The ranch house was torn down in 1973.

Ellen lived, on and off, at Miramar until 1897 when she moved into a seaside cottage that she had built in La Jolla. She named it South Molton Villa (sometimes spelled South Moulton Villa) after the street on which she had been born. Ellen hosted many events in South Molton Villa and allowed others to visit her home, keeping a guest book where guests would leave their impressions of the area.

In 1909, she and her sister Virginia helped Joseph H. Johnson, the bishop of the Los Angeles Diocese of the Episcopal Church, to establish The Bishop's School as a preparatory school for girls.

Ellen gradually stepped out of her intimate family circle and began to acquire a large set of female acquaintances. La Jolla had a growing number of summer and year-round residents, many of whom were unmarried women or widows. She remarked that in the early days, "It was a woman's town." She was a frequent member of the La Jolla Woman's Club and participated in the club's many discussions about literature and politics. Through the club, she became involved with a variety of progressive movements and delivered many speeches to the club members, including a speech responding to the San Diego free speech fight in 1912.

South Molton Villa, located on Prospect St. in La Jolla, was located next to Wisteria Cottage, a bungalow owned by Virginia Scripps. Wisteria Cottage was renovated in 1910 by architect Irving J. Gill a pioneer in the modernist movement. It now serves as the gallery and exhibition space of the La Jolla Historical Society.

On August 7, 1915, an arsonist set fire to South Molton Villa, destroying the building and many of its invaluable documents. Scripps received much support from her friends and neighbors. She promptly commissioned Irving J. Gill to redesign South Molton Villa and to build new, fireproof concrete structures in the same modern architectural language as The Bishop's School, the La Jolla Woman's Club, and the La Jolla Recreational Center. It has been described as one of Gill's "masterworks." In 1941, Ellen's trustees donated her house to The Art Center, later the Museum of Contemporary Art in La Jolla. The structure was altered beyond recognition. In 1996, a renovation by Robert Venturi and Denise Scott Brown exposed the original facade.

Wealth
Ellen Browning Scripps made a fortune by investing in E.W. Scripps's growing chain of newspapers in the West. In 1894, E.W. formed a partnership with Milton A. McRae, who had risen through the ranks to become one of Scripps's top lieutenants. George H. Scripps joined the partnership in 1895. The group managed The Cincinnati Post, The Cleveland Press, The St. Louis Chronicle, The Toledo News-Bee, and the Kansas City Star. They also acquired newspapers in Memphis, Oklahoma City, Evansville, Terre Haute, Columbus, Denver, Dallas, and Houston. In the late 1890s, E.W. began to acquire papers in California, including The Los Angeles Record, The San Diego Sun, and The San Francisco News. In the Pacific Northwest, the growing profitability of working-class newspapers led to the development of The Seattle Star, The Spokane Press, The Tacoma Times, and The Portland News, all pitched to dock workers, miners, lumbermen, and cannery workers. By 1905, E.W. estimated that profits on "my little Western papers" were many times greater than those of his Eastern ones.

George H. Scripps died in 1900, leaving behind a will described as "a legacy of hate." He gave his shares of Evening News stock to E.W., whom James E. Scripps considered his nemesis. Ellen, meanwhile, received George's shares of the Scripps Publishing Co. This led to an eleven-year legal battle that E.W. and Ellen ultimately won.

Philanthropy
Interested in science and education, Ellen Browning Scripps donated the bulk of her fortune to the Scripps Institution of Oceanography, The Bishop’s School in La Jolla, and the Scripps College in Claremont, California. She also financed the construction of the La Jolla Women's Club, the La Jolla Recreational Center, the La Jolla Playground and Clubhouse (later renamed the Ellen Browning Scripps Park), and the La Jolla Children's Pool. Scripps funded many wildlife preservation and education initiatives, including the Torrey Pines State Natural Reserve, San Diego Natural History Museum, select wildlife books and collections (including William Leon Dawson's Birds of California), and the San Diego Zoo.  After a stay in the hospital due to a broken hip, Ellen helped found the Scripps Memorial Hospital and funded the Scripps Research Clinic. These organizations eventually became The Scripps Research Institute, and two of the core providers now comprising Scripps Health—Scripps Memorial Hospital La Jolla and Scripps Clinic. The New York Times estimated that, during her lifetime, she gave gifts and donations to charitable causes that totaled more than $2 million, a conservative estimate  dollars.

Although Scripps garnered much public attention from her philanthropic projects, she avoided publicizing her gifts and drawing attention to herself, since "publicity is distasteful to Miss Scripps."

Death
Ellen Browning Scripps died in her La Jolla home on August 3, 1932, a few weeks before her ninety-sixth birthday. Shortly thereafter, the leading newspaper trade journal Editor & Publisher praised her contributions to American journalism: "Many women have contributed, directly and indirectly, to the development of the American press, but none more influentially and beneficently than Ellen Browning Scripps." The New York Times, meanwhile, recognized her as "one of the pioneers in modern American journalism." Her obituary described her as a woman who had perfected "the art of living" as well as the art of giving.

Legacy

Scripps was nominated and inducted into the Women's Hall of Fame in 2007 hosted by the Women's Museum of California; Commission on the Status of Women; University of California, San Diego Women's Center; and San Diego State University Women's Studies.

From the 1920s, Scripps was the major benefactor of the San Diego Natural History Museum, financing its building and education programs.  In 1933, the Scripps estate donated over 1,000 watercolor paintings of California wildflowers by A. R. Valentien to the San Diego Natural History Museum. Over 2500 books of her library's book collection were donated to the Claremont Colleges, where they can now be accessed from the Claremont Colleges Library and Denison Library.

The following are institutions Scripps helped to establish or fund:
Scripps College in Claremont, CA
Scripps Institution of Oceanography, UC San Diego, est. 1903, formerly known as the Marine Biological Association
Scripps Research Institute
Scripps Aquarium, La Jolla (now Birch Aquarium at Scripps)
The Bishop's School in La Jolla, San Diego, CA
Scripps Memorial Hospital
Scripps Metabolic Clinic
La Jolla Woman's Club
Torrey Pines State Reserve
The Children's Pool, est. 1931
Donations to
Pomona College
Knox College
Cleveland College and Cleveland Museum of Natural History
Constantinople Women's College
San Diego State University (Scripps Cottage)
City of Rushville, Illinois
San Diego Museum Association
The Children's Home, San Diego
St. James by-the-Sea Episcopal Church, La Jolla
La Jolla Athenaeum Music & Arts Library
La Jolla-Riford Branch Library
San Diego Society of Natural History
San Diego Museum of Man's Ancient Egypt exhibit
San Diego Zoo
San Diego YMCA and YWCA
Asilomar Conference Center (YWCA)
Community Welfare Building
Travelers Aid Society of San Diego

See also
 List of people on the cover of Time Magazine: 1920s - 22 Feb. 1926

References

Further reading
 Molly McClain, Ellen Browning Scripps: New Money and American Philanthropy (University of Nebraska Press, 2017)
 Molly McClain, "The La Jolla of Ellen Browning Scripps," The Journal of San Diego History 57, no. 4 (2011)
 Bruce Kamerling, "How Ellen Scripps Brought Ancient Egypt to San Diego", The Journal of San Diego History 38, no. 2 (1992) 
 Elizabeth N. Shor, "How Scripps Institution Came To San Diego," The Journal of San Diego History 27, no. 3 (Summer 1981)
 Ellen Browning Scripps, in Carl Heilbron, History of San Diego (San Diego: San Diego Press Club, 1936), pp. 92–94
 "In California," Time magazine, February 22, 1926

External links
 https://ellenbrowningscripps.com
 Ellen Browning Scripps — Scripps Health.
 E.W. Scripps Papers, Mahn Center for Archives & Special Collections, Ohio University Libraries, Athens, Ohio. — Manuscript collection, primarily correspondence.
 Ellen Browning Scripps Collection, Ella Strong Denison Library, Scripps College, Claremont, CA.  — Manuscript collection, primarily correspondence.
 Museum of Contemporary Art San Diego — on the site of her residence in La Jolla.
 The San Diego Natural History Museum Research Library houses a significant collection of Ellen Browning Scripps’ papers. 

Ellen Browning
American women journalists
20th-century American philanthropists
Philanthropists from California
1836 births
1932 deaths
British emigrants to the United States
People from La Jolla, San Diego
People from San Diego
People from Alameda, California
People associated with the San Diego Natural History Museum
History of San Diego
Scripps Research
Scripps Institution of Oceanography
Knox College (Illinois) alumni
The Detroit News people
American investors
American women investors
19th-century American journalists
20th-century American journalists
19th-century American women writers
20th-century American women writers
20th-century American writers
20th-century American businesswomen
20th-century American businesspeople
20th-century women philanthropists